Sabrina Agresti-Roubache (née Roubache; born 13 October 1976) is a French film producer and politician of LREM who has been representing Bouches-du-Rhône's 1st constituency in the National Assembly since 2022.

Early life
Born into a family of Algerian immigrants as the third of six siblings, Agresti-Roubache grew up in Provence. She spent her early years in the Félix-Pyat housing project, which has since become one of the most precarious in Marseille. 

Agresti-Roubache holds a bachelor's degree in literature. She left law school to work with French hip hop band IAM and then with the footballer Eric Cantona. In 2016, she became one of the producers of the Netflix series Marseille.

Political career
In Parliament, Agresti-Roubache has been serving on the Committee on Legal Affairs since 2022. She also serves as spokesperson of her parliamentary group, under the leadership of its chair Aurore Bergé.

Personal life
Agresti-Roubache and Jean-Philippe Agresti have been married since 2021.

See also 

 List of deputies of the 16th National Assembly of France

References 

Living people
1976 births
Deputies of the 16th National Assembly of the French Fifth Republic
21st-century French women politicians
Women members of the National Assembly (France)
La République En Marche! politicians
Members of Parliament for Bouches-du-Rhône
Politicians from Marseille
French people of Algerian descent
Members of the Regional Council of Provence-Alpes-Côte d'Azur